The 1984 South African Grand Prix was a Formula One motor race held at Kyalami on 7 April 1984. It was race 2 of 16 in the 1984 Formula One World Championship. The 75-lap race was won by Niki Lauda, driving a McLaren-TAG, with teammate Alain Prost second and Derek Warwick third in a Renault.

Report

Qualifying
Qualifying saw reigning World Champion Nelson Piquet take the first of an eventual nine pole positions for 1984 in his Brabham-BMW, with Keke Rosberg alongside him on the front row in his Williams-Honda. On the second row were Nigel Mansell in the Lotus and Patrick Tambay in the factory Renault, while on the third row were Alain Prost in the McLaren and Teo Fabi in the second Brabham. The top ten was completed by Elio de Angelis in the second Lotus, Niki Lauda in the second McLaren, Derek Warwick in the second Renault and Michele Alboreto in the Ferrari. The Cosworth-powered Tyrrells and Arrows struggled, with Thierry Boutsen coming 27th and last in his Arrows and thus failing to qualify.

Race
In the Sunday morning warm-up session Piercarlo Ghinzani, who had qualified 20th in his Osella, crashed heavily at the fast left-hand Jukskei Sweep, the car bursting into flames. Ghinzani escaped with minor burns on his hands, and subsequently withdrew from the race, thus promoting Boutsen to the last grid spot.

At the start, Piquet almost stalled on the grid and was passed by Rosberg and Mansell. The Lotus then faltered and Mansell fell down the order, putting Piquet back up to second by the first corner. At the end of lap 1, Piquet passed Rosberg for the lead, before teammate Fabi moved into second on lap 2. Lauda had made a good start to run fourth; he then overtook Rosberg on lap 4 and Fabi on lap 10. Both Brabhams then hit trouble, needing new tyres before retiring with turbo failures, Fabi on lap 19 and Piquet on lap 30.

From there, Lauda controlled the race and went on to win easily, with Prost over a minute behind in second and the only other driver on the lead lap. Warwick gained his first Formula One podium by finishing third, while completing the top six were Riccardo Patrese (Alfa Romeo), Andrea de Cesaris (Ligier-Renault) and, gaining his first ever World Championship point, Ayrton Senna in his Toleman-Hart.

Classification

Qualifying

Race

Championship standings after the race

Drivers' Championship standings

Constructors' Championship standings

References

South African Grand Prix
South African Grand Prix
Grand Prix
April 1984 sports events in Africa